Adam Docker may refer to:

 Adam Docker (footballer) (born 1985), English-Pakistani footballer
 Adam Docker (rugby league) (born 1991), Australian rugby league footballer